Euderces hoegei is a species of beetle in the family Cerambycidae. It was described by Henry Walter Bates in 1885 and is known from Veracruz and Chiapas in southern Mexico.

References

Euderces
Beetles of North America
Insects of Mexico
Beetles described in 1885
Taxa named by Henry Walter Bates